Eurimbula is a coastal rural locality in the Gladstone Region, Queensland, Australia.

It is home to the Eurimbula National Park. The town is part of the Gooreng Gooreng Aboriginal people's traditional territory.

Geography
The waters and inlets of the Coral Sea form the north-western, northern, eastern, and south-eastern boundaries. The Bustard Head Light is within the locality.

Heritage listings
Eurimbula has a number of heritage-listed sites, including:
  south of Gladstone: Bustard Head Light

Education 
There are no schools in Eurimbula. The nearest primary schools are in neighbouring Agnes Water and Bororen. The nearest government secondary schools are in Tannum Sands and Rosedale; there is a private secondary school in Agnes Water.

References

Gladstone Region
Coastline of Queensland
Localities in Queensland